Igloolik Airport (Inuktitut: ᐃᒡᓗᓕᒃ ᒥᑦᑕᕐᕕᐊ Iglulik Mittarvia)  is located at Igloolik, Nunavut, Canada, and is operated by the government of Nunavut.

Airlines and destinations

Accidents and incidents
On 29 November 1975, a Douglas C-47A C-FOOX of Kenting Atlas Aviation was damaged beyond economic repair at Igloolik Airport.

Gallery

References

External links

Airports in the Arctic
Certified airports in the Qikiqtaaluk Region